Rize is a city and the capital of Rize Province in Turkey.

Rize may also refer to:

 Rize (album), R&B singer Dwele's 2000 self-released demo
 Rize (band), a Japanese rock band
 Rize (film), a 2005 documentary by David LaChapelle about krumping and clowning
 Rize (soundtrack)
 Rize Province, a province of north-east Turkey
 Rize tea, a kind of black tea produced in Rize Province
 Rize Shinba, Japanese manga author and illustrator
 "Rize", a song by the Outlawz
 A brand name for Clotiazepam, a sedative drug
 A slang term for ingesting THC using a Vaporizer
 Rize (Is the Order a Rabbit?), a character in the manga series Is the Order a Rabbit?

See also
 Rize of the Fenix, a 2012 album by the American rock band Tenacious D
 Riza, a metal cover protecting a religious icon
 Rise (disambiguation)
 Rice (disambiguation)
 Rza (disambiguation)
 Hot Rize (disambiguation)